Ras-related GTP binding C, also known as RRAGC, is a protein which in humans is encoded by the RRAGC gene.

RRAGC is a monomeric guanine nucleotide-binding protein, or G protein. By binding GTP or GDP, small G proteins act as molecular switches in numerous cell processes and signaling pathways.

Interactions 

RRAGC has been shown to interact with RRAGA.

References

Further reading